Tres de febrero (3 February) is a notable date in Argentine history.  On 3 February 1852 General Juan Manuel de Rosas, a great rival of President Domingo Faustino Sarmiento, was defeated.

Sources

 Wikipedia article: Parque Tres de Febrero

Political history of Argentina
Argentina